Hochschild Mining plc is a leading British-based silver and gold mining business operating in North, Central, and South America. It is headquartered in Lima, Peru, with a corporate office in London, is listed on the London Stock Exchange. The main shareholder is the Peruvian businessman Eduardo Hochschild.

History
The company was founded in 1911 by Moritz "Mauricio" Hochschild, one of South America's three tin barons. He had mining operations in several countries, primarily in Bolivia and Chile.

The company was first listed on the London Stock Exchange in 2006. It started operations at the San José mine in Argentina in June 2007, at the Moris mine in Mexico in August 2007, and at the Pallancata mine in southern Peru in September 2007.

In 2012 local people in Chumbivilcas complained about the Ares mine and the government of Peru decided to suspend operations in Ares on a temporary basis so it could carry out an environmental audit.

Operations
The Company has mines in the following locations:
 Peru – Arcata, Pallancata and Inmaculada mines
 Argentina – San José mine

References

External links
 Official site

Non-renewable resource companies established in 1911
Gold mining companies of the United Kingdom
Silver mining companies
1911 establishments in England
Mining in Argentina
Mining in Mexico
Mining in Peru
Companies listed on the London Stock Exchange